Steven Isserlis  (born 19 December 1958) is a British cellist. He has led a distinguished career as a soloist, chamber musician, educator, author and broadcaster. Acclaimed for his profound musicianship, he is also noted for his diverse repertoire, command of phrasing, and distinctive sound which is deployed with his use of gut strings.

Early life and education
Isserlis was born in London on 19 December 1958 into a musical family. His mother was a piano teacher, and his father was a keen amateur musician. His sister Annette is a viola player, and his other sister Rachel is a violinist. Isserlis has described how "playing music, playing together", was an integral part of his early family life. His grandfather, Julius Isserlis, who was a Russian Jew, was one of 12 musicians allowed to leave Russia in the 1920s to promote Russian culture, but he never returned.

On the Midweek programme on 29 January 2014, Isserlis revealed that on arrival in Vienna in 1922, his pianist grandfather and father found a flat, but the 102-year-old landlady refused to take in a musician, because her aunt had a previous musician tenant who was noisy and would spit on the floor—this tenant was Ludwig van Beethoven.

Isserlis went to the City of London School, which he left at the age of 14 to move to Scotland to study under the tutelage of Jane Cowan. From 1976 to 1978 Isserlis studied at the Oberlin Conservatory of Music with Richard Kapuscinski. Ever since his youth Daniil Shafran has been his cello hero, of whom Isserlis has described how "his vibrato, his phrasing, his rhythm all belonged to a unique whole... he was incapable of playing one note insincerely; his music spoke from the soul."

The name 'Isserlis' is one of many European variations of the Hebrew name 'Israel'.

Career
Isserlis's breakthrough came in 1988, when he contacted John Tavener's publisher to ask if the composer would compose a write for cello and orchestra. The result of this was The Protecting Veil, and Isserlis premiered it at the BBC Proms. The piece and also Isserlis' subsequent recording of it became very popular. 

Isserlis enjoys an active solo career and regularly appears with many of the world's leading ensembles. He has performed with orchestras such as the Berliner Philharmoniker, Wiener Philharmoniker, Philharmonia Orchestra, London Philharmonic Orchestra, Tonhalle-Orchester Zürich, London Symphony Orchestra, Los Angeles Philharmonic, Cleveland Orchestra, Chicago Symphony Orchestra, Deutsches Symphonie-Orchester Berlin and the NHK Symphony Orchestra. He has also curated concert series for Wigmore Hall, New York's 92nd Street Y and the Salzburg Festival.

Isserlis is a staunch advocate of lesser-known composers and of greater access to music for younger audiences. He is committed to authentic performance and frequently performs with the foremost period instrument orchestras. He has performed Beethoven with fortepianist Robert Levin in Boston and London, and Dvořák's Cello Concerto with the Orchestra of the Age of Enlightenment with Sir Simon Rattle. He has also published several editions and arrangements, principally for Faber Music, and was an advisor on new editions of Beethoven's cello sonatas and cello variations, as well as the cello concertos of Dvořák and Elgar. He commissioned a new completion of Prokofiev's Cello Concertino from the Udmurt musicologist Vladimir Blok, which was premiered on 11 April 1997 in Cardiff, with the BBC National Orchestra of Wales conducted by Mark Wigglesworth. At the other end of the spectrum, Isserlis has premiered works by composers John Tavener, Lowell Liebermann, Carl Vine, David Matthews, John Woolrich, Wolfgang Rihm, Mikhail Pletnev and Thomas Adès.

Isserlis has presented a number of festivals with long-term collaborators such as Joshua Bell, Stephen Hough, Mikhail Pletnev, András Schiff, Denes Varjon, Olli Mustonen and Tabea Zimmermann, and actors Barry Humphries and Simon Callow. He is artistic director of the International Musicians Seminar, Prussia Cove in West Cornwall, where he both performs and teaches.

Instruments

Isserlis plays the Marquis de Corberon Stradivarius cello of 1726 on loan from the Royal Academy of Music. He also part-owns a Montagnana cello from 1740 and a Guadagnini cello from 1745, which he played exclusively from 1979 to 1998. Previously, he also performed on the De Munck Stradivarius which was loaned from the Nippon Music Foundation.

Writings
Steven Isserlis is the author of two books for children on the lives of famous composers: the first is Why Beethoven Threw the Stew (Faber, 2001), and the second is Why Handel Waggled His Wig (Faber, 2006). He has also written three stories that have been set to music by Oscar-winning composer Anne Dudley. The first of the series Little Red Violin (and the Big, Bad Cello) received its first performance in New York in March 2007, followed by Goldipegs and the Three Cellos, and Cindercella.

In September 2016, Isserlis' book targeted towards young musicians Robert Schumann's Advice to Young Musicians Revisited by Steven Isserlis was published by Faber & Faber.

In October 2021, Faber & Faber published Isserlis' book The Bach Cello Suites – A Companion, a volume entirely devoted to the history and music of Bach's Suites for unaccompanied cello.

Honours
Isserlis was appointed a Commander of the Order of the British Empire (CBE) in 1998, and collected his award with his father, as his mother had died earlier that week. In 2000, he was awarded the Robert Schumann Prize of the City of Zwickau. He is also one of the two living cellists included in the Gramophone Hall of Fame.

Personal life
His wife Pauline Mara, a flautist, died of cancer in June 2010. They have a son, Gabriel, born in 1990.

Isserlis lives in London.

Discography

Isserlis' recordings reflect the breadth and eclecticism of his repertoire. His most recent release of reVisions for BIS includes arrangements and reconstruction of works by Debussy, Ravel, Prokofiev and Bloch. For Hyperion Records, Isserlis has recorded Schumann's music for cello and piano (Dénes Várjon), and the complete solo cello suites by Bach, which has won many awards, including Listeners' Disc of the Year on BBC Radio 3's CD Review, Gramophone's Instrumental Disc of the Year, and "Critic's Choice" at the 2008 Classical Brits. Other releases include two recordings with Stephen Hough: the Brahms sonatas, coupled with works by Dvořák and Suk; a highly acclaimed disc of children's cello music for BIS Records; and a recording with Thomas Ades of his new piece 'Lieux retrouvés'. Recent releases included a disc in 2013 of Dvořák's Cello Concerto with Daniel Harding and the Mahler Chamber Orchestra on Hyperion and Martinu's complete cello sonatas with Olli Mustonen on the BIS label in 2014 which received a Grammy nomination.

In 2017, Isserlis' recording of Haydn's Cello Concertos was nominated for a Grammy Award.

Bibliography

References

External links
Official website
IMG Artists
IMS Prussia Cove
Steven Isserlis – Hyperion Records
Steven Isserlis – BIS Records

1958 births
APRA Award winners
Living people
Writers from London
English Jews
British people of Moldovan-Jewish descent
Jewish classical musicians
English classical cellists
English children's writers
Children's non-fiction writers
Honorary Members of the Royal Academy of Music
Commanders of the Order of the British Empire
Oberlin College alumni
People educated at the City of London School
EMI Classics and Virgin Classics artists
English people of Russian-Jewish descent